In February 1948, Yigal Allon, commander of the Palmach in the north, ordered an attack on Sa'sa'. The order was given to Moshe Kelman, the deputy commander of Third Battalion. The order read: "You have to blow up twenty houses and kill as many warriors as possible". According to Ilan Pappé, "warriors"  should be read as "villagers" to properly understand the order. Khalidi,  referencing  "The History of the Haganah" by Ben-Zion Dinur, say they referred to the massacre as "one of the most daring raids into enemy territory."

One history of 1948 asserts that the reason for the attack was to restore Jewish public confidence in their fighting forces following the deaths of all the members of a platoon attempting to take supplies to Kfar Etzion a month previously.

Moreover, according to Efraim Karsh, on January 20-21 some 400 armed Arab fighters from 2nd Yarmuk Regiment of Arab Liberation Army based in Sa'sa' carried out attacks on isolated kibbutz Yechiam in western Galilee.

On February 15, 1948, a Palmach unit entered the village during the night and, without resistance, planted explosives against some of the houses. It was reported at the time that ten or more houses were totally or partially destroyed and 11 villagers were killed (5 of them small children). According to the official history of the Haganah, the village had been used as a base for Arab fighters. However, press reports at the time sited by Khalidi belie this, since the Palmach units met "without opposition" in the village. According to Benvenisti (who gives the date of the attack as 14 February), the Palmach units that raided Sa'sa' killed 60 people and demolished 16 houses.

It was not until October 30, 1948, as part of Operation Hiram, that the forces of the Haganah occupied Sa'sa'. Those villagers who had not already fled were expelled. There are also allegations of war crimes at this time. Northern Command OC Moshe Carmel later reported that he had seen evidence of killings, and an official investigation by Major Emanuel Yalan suggested that some villagers, including some with disabilities, may have been killed after the village was occupied. However, the relevant files remain closed to historians.

Currently, there are few remains of the Palestinian village of Sa'sa', with the exception of the village mosque, which has now been converted into the kibbutz cultural center.

In 1992, the Palestinian historian Walid Khalidi described the remains of the village: "Some of the old olive trees remain, and a number of walls and houses still stand. Some of the houses are presently used by kibbutz Sasa; one of them has an arched entrance and arched windows. A large portion of the surrounding land is forested, the rest is cultivated by Israeli farmers."

See also 
Depopulated Palestinian locations in Israel
Killings and massacres during the 1948 Palestine War

References

Bibliography

 Cited in Petersen, (2001)
 
 (p. 256)
 
Gibson, S and Braun, E. (1972) Sa'sa', HA, 63-64, pp 11–12 (in Hebrew). Cited in Petersen, 2002
 

 

 (Sa'sa' pp. 46, 95)
 

 
 (pp. 368-369)
 

Massacres in Israel
Massacres in Mandatory Palestine
1948 in Mandatory Palestine